Mike Tyson vs. Kevin McBride was a professional boxing match contested on June 11, 2005. Although Tyson appeared to be ahead on points on the judges' scorecards through six rounds, he failed to answer the bell for the 7th round and was ruled defeated by technical knockout.

Background

After being knocked out in the fourth round of his previous fight against Danny Williams on July30, 2004, Mike Tyson took a lengthy hiatus as he contemplated whether or not he would continue to fight. In April 2005, Tyson officially announced his return to boxing to take on little-known Irish journeyman Kevin McBride on June 11 in Washington, D.C. Though the 38–year old Tyson was far removed from his prime, he nevertheless predicted an easy victory, vowing to "gut (McBride) like a fish" while also calling his opponent a "tomato can".

McBride, however, remained confident that he could upset Tyson and promised that he would "shock the world" by defeating Tyson Prior to the fight, Tyson parted ways with trainer Freddie Roach, who had trained Tyson for his two previous fights against Clifford Etienne in 2003 and Williams in 2004, and replaced him with former super bantamweight champion Jeff Fenech.

The fight
For much of the fight, Tyson labored against the bigger McBride, who used his distinct height advantage and a sharp left-jab to keep the aggressive Tyson at bay through the first two rounds. Tyson was able to land more punches in the third and fourth, but McBride would often clinch and lean on Tyson in an effort to wear Tyson out. By the fifth round, the strategy appeared to have worked as Tyson seemed tired and McBride was able to land several good punches during the round, though Tyson was still able to win the round on two of the judge's scorecards.

In the sixth round, the final round of Tyson's professional career, a frustrated Tyson attempted to break McBride's left arm after the two were tied-up in a clinch, for which Tyson was warned by referee Joe Cortez. Shortly after, however, Tyson suffered a two-point deduction after hitting McBride with an intentional head butt that opened a cut above McBride's eye. As the round came to a close, a shove by McBride caused Tyson to fall to the canvas, but it was ruled a slip rather than a knockdown. Tyson would have won the round, but the two-point deduction gave McBride a 9–8 win on the scorecards.

Though Tyson still led on two of the judges' scorecards, Tyson shockingly quit on his stool before the seventh round began, automatically giving McBride the victory by technical knockout.

Footnotes

Mcbride
2005 in boxing
Boxing in Washington, D.C.
2005 in sports in Washington, D.C.
June 2005 sports events in the United States